Jessica Green is an American engineer, ecologist, and entrepreneur whose research focuses on Microbial Ecology and Genomics. She is an Alec and Kay Keith Professor at the University of Oregon, where she is founding director of the Biology and Built Environment Center, and external faculty at the Santa Fe Institute. Green co-founded Phylagen Inc. in 2015 with Harrison Dillon, the founder of Solazyme.

Green’s two talks at the TED Conferences on the Microbiome of the Built Environment have received over 1.5 million views.

Education
Green received a Ph.D. in nuclear engineering and a Master of Science in civil and environmental engineering from University of California, Berkeley, and a B.S. in civil and environmental engineering, magna cum laude, from University of California, Los Angeles.

Awards
Green was awarded a TED Fellowship in 2010 and a TED Senior Fellowship in 2011. In 2013 she was awarded a Guggenheim Fellowship for work on a science fiction graphic novel about the Human Microbiome. In 2013 Green was awarded a Blaise Pascal International Research Chair

References

External links
 
 University homepage
 
 

Living people
Year of birth missing (living people)
University of Oregon faculty
21st-century American biologists
Place of birth missing (living people)
Santa Fe Institute people
UC Berkeley College of Engineering alumni
American women scientists
American women academics
21st-century American women scientists